Cyrtusa is a genus of round fungus beetles in the family Leiodidae. There are at least two described species in Cyrtusa.

Species
These two species belong to the genus Cyrtusa:
 Cyrtusa grossepunctata Daffner, 1988
 Cyrtusa subtestacea (Gyllenhal, 1813)

References

Further reading

 
 
 

Leiodidae
Articles created by Qbugbot